Arms and the Covenant is a 1938 non-fiction book written by Winston Churchill. It was later published in the United States as While England Slept; a Survey of World Affairs, 1932–1938. It highlighted the United Kingdom's lack of military preparation to face the threat of Nazi Germany's expansion and attacked the current policies of the British government, led by the Conservative Prime Minister Neville Chamberlain. The book galvanised many of his supporters and built up public opposition to the Munich Agreement.

John F. Kennedy was inspired by the book's title when he published his thesis, which he wrote during his senior year at Harvard College and in which he examined the reasons for Britain's lack of preparation. Originally titled Appeasement in Munich, it was titled Why England Slept upon its 1940 publication.

References

External links
 

1938 non-fiction books
1938 in England
Books about international relations
Books about the United Kingdom
Books about politics of the United Kingdom
Books by Winston Churchill
Non-fiction books about diplomacy
Books about World War II
Books about foreign relations of the United Kingdom
George G. Harrap and Co. books
Books written by prime ministers of the United Kingdom